Minettia inusta  is a species of fly in the family Lauxaniidae. It is found in the  Palearctic .

References

Lauxaniidae
Insects described in 1826
Muscomorph flies of Europe